The J.J. Deal and Son Carriage Factory was the largest factory built in Jonesville, Michigan. It is the only 19th century factory remaining in the City. It is located at 117 West Street. On August 1, 2012, the building was added to the National Register of Historic Places. The building was redeveloped into the Heritage Lane Apartments in 2015.

J.J. Deal and Son History
Jacob J. Deal was a blacksmith who moved to Jonesville, Michigan in 1857. Once he relocated to Jonesville, Deal began to manufacture a small number of lumber wagons and other heavy wagons. Deal sold his blacksmith shop in 1865 and erected two small buildings across the street, where he began the full-time manufacture of wagons and carriages. As the business grew, he repeatedly enlarged his factory. In 1890, he began construction on a new factory building, forming the core of the structure which still stands today. A number of additions were made to the building from 1893 to 1909, and the factory eventually employed over 100 men. In 1891, Deal's son, George, became a partner and began managing the company, which was renamed J.J. Deal and Son. 

In 1908, the company began assembling automobiles, which they called Autobuggies, and the company was reorganized under the name of the Deal Buggy Company. By 1910, the number of workers had increased to 140. Several models of the Deal Automobile were manufactured from 1908 until 1911, with costs ranging from about $950 to $1,250. The company went out of business in 1915.

Gallery

Later History
In 1922, the Universal Body Company took over the entire complex, where it manufactured motor bus bodies.  In 1927, the Kiddie Brush & Toy Company took over the factory.  The company made children's housekeeping toys, which were sold under the Susy Goose name.  In 1949, it started making plastic injection molded toys then in the 1960s made Barbie and Ken furniture and accessories for Mattel. In 1967, the company moved its headquarters to Edon, Ohio. In 1972, the J.R. Headers Company moved into the space but only for a short time until 1976 when it moved out.

Over the next 40 years, the building stood underutilized or vacant until 2014, when the Michigan State Housing Development Authority approved a tax credit application by Excel-Sterling LDHA LP to provide Section 42 tax credits for the re-development of the building. Construction began in 2015 to redevelop the property into the "Heritage Lane Apartments," to provide residential living for 44 families over four floors. Construction on the building was completed in July 2016. The completed building includes a computer room, management and maintenance offices, a resident library and historic interior décor. An original JJ Deal Buggy built in the 1890s stands in the building's lobby. A Michigan historic marker stands at the edge of the Heritage Lane property and identifies the building and its historical context.

Building Description

The J.J. Deal and Son Carriage Factory is a four-story brick building with a long rectangular footprint. The front of the building contains three bays separated by brick piers. The center bay contains an entrance with transom window above. Double-hung windows in jack-arch openings are located in the side bays and in the upper floors. Brick bands run across the top of the third floor and fourth floor. The side elevation contains 30 equally spaced openings on each floor. Two openings on the first floor contain entrances; the remaining openings contain double-hung windows similar to those on the front elevation.

The building is representative of late 19th century mill and factory buildings constructed in Michigan and across the United States.

References

Industrial buildings and structures on the National Register of Historic Places in Michigan
Commercial buildings completed in 1893
Buildings and structures in Hillsdale County, Michigan
National Register of Historic Places in Hillsdale County, Michigan